The European Commissioner for Budget and Administration is the member of the European Commission who is responsible for negotiating and managing the EU budget. The current commissioner is Johannes Hahn.

The portfolio is primarily responsible for the management of the budget of the European Union and related financial issues except for budgetary discharge which falls under the Admin Commissioner.

The Commissioners
Janusz Lewandowski was the European Commissioner for Financial Programming and the Budget as part of the Barroso Commission II. His predecessor was Algirdas Šemeta, who in turn succeeded fellow Lithuanian Dalia Grybauskaitė. The European Parliament approved a Commissioner for Financial Programming & the Budget for the first time in 2004, a position expanded since the Prodi Commission to include Financial Programming.

The Commissioner's 121.6 billion euro 2008 budget proposed that for the first time, the budget towards sustainable growth (€57.2 billion) would be higher than that of the Common Agricultural Policy (€56.3 billion), traditionally the largest source of expenditure in the EU. There would be an increase in cohesion funds, energy and transport of 14%, research by 11% and lifelong learning by 9%. There would also be an increase in the administrative budget, aid to Kosovo and Palestinian institutions and funds towards the Galileo project.

List of commissioners

See also
 Directorate-General for Budget
 European Union Budget

References

External links
 Commissioner's Website
 Commission Budget Website 
 DG Budget

Budget of the European Union
Financial Programming and the Budget